The Kelvin Gold Medal is a British engineering prize.

In the annual report for 1914, it was reported that the Lord Kelvin Memorial Executive Committee decided that the balance of funds left over from providing a memorial window at Westminster Abbey should be devoted to provide a Kelvin Gold Medal to mark "a distinction in engineering work or investigation" by the Presidents of eight leading British Engineering Institutions. There was a delay in awarding the first medal, due to the World War.

The medal has been given triennially since 1920 for "distinguished service in the application of science to engineering". The prize is administered by the Institution of Civil Engineers (Great Britain).  The Committee of Presidents considers recommendations received from similar bodies from all parts of the world. The first recipient was William Unwin.

Recipients

See also

 List of engineering awards

References 

Awards established in 1920
Awards of the Institution of Civil Engineers